Sultan Sir Hisamuddin Alam Shah Al-Haj Ibni Almarhum Sultan Alaeddin Sulaiman Shah  (13 May 1898 – 1 September 1960) was the second Yang di-Pertuan Agong of Malaya from 14 April to 1 September 1960, and the sixth Sultan of Selangor between 1938–1942 and again from 1945–1960.

Early life and education

He was the third son of Sultan Alauddin Sulaiman Shah ibni Raja Muda Musa (1863–1938) by Cik Puan Hasnah binti Pilong, a commoner wife. Named Tengku Alam Shah at birth, he was not expected to succeed as he had two elder half-brothers.

Educated at the Malay College Kuala Kangsar, he was instrumental in the establishment of the Malay College Old Boys Association (MCOBA) in 1929. In 1931, he was appointed Tengku Laksamana of Selangor, having previously served as Tengku Panglima Raja.

Selangor succession dispute

Sultan Alaeddin Sulaiman Shah had many children, his first three sons in chronological order being Tengku Musa Eddin, Tengku Badar Shah and Tengku Alam Shah. The first two sons were children by his royal consort, Tengku Ampuan Maharum binti Tengku Dhiauddin of the royal house of Kedah. In 1903, Tunku Musa Eddin had been made Tengku Mahkota and was promoted to Raja Muda or heir apparent in 1920.

However, at the instigation of the British Resident, Theodore Samuel Adams (1885–1961; in office 1935 – 1937), Tengku Musa Eddin was dismissed as Raja Muda in 1934 for alleged "misbehaviour". Adams had accused Tengku Musa Eddin as a spendthrift and wastrel with a penchant for gambling. However, many Malays in Selangor believed the real reason for Tengku Musa Eddin's dismissal was his refusal to follow Adam's orders.

Although Sultan Sulaiman pleaded for the case of Tengku Musa Eddin (even petitioning the Secretary of State for the Colonies and discussing the issue directly with him in London), Tengku Alam Shah was instead proclaimed Raja Muda or heir to the throne over the head of his other half-brother Tengku Badar. The appointment occurred on 20 July 1936.

First reign as Sultan of Selangor

Tengku Alam Shah was proclaimed Sultan on 4 April  1938, four days after the death of his father. On 26 January 1939, he was crowned at Istana Mahkota Puri in Klang. Tengku Musa Eddin, then Tengku Kelana Jaya Putera, presided over the ceremony.

Japanese occupation

On 15 January 1942, Col. Fujiyama, the Japanese Military Governor of Selangor, invited Sultan Hisamuddin Alam Shah to King's House in Kuala Lumpur.  In an interview with Major-General Minaki, the Sultan confessed that he had made speeches in support of the British war efforts but had been persuaded by the British resident to do so. After being told to surrender the regalia to his older brother, the Japanese removed Sultan Alam Shah and in November 1943, proclaimed Tengku Musa Eddin as the new Sultan Musa Ghiatuddin Riayat Shah of Selangor.

Sultan Hisamuddin Alam Shah declined to work with the Japanese and from 1943, refused their allowance awarded to him and his children.

Second reign as Sultan of Selangor

The return of the British finally brought Sultan Hisamuddin Alam Shah back to the throne, while ex-Sultan Musa was exiled to the Cocos Keeling Islands. Although he had signed the Malayan Union treaty, like all other Malay rulers, he later repudiated it and gave open support to Malay nationalist effort to overthrow the plan. 

On 1 March 1946, Sultan Alam Shah officiated the First Malay Unity Congress at the Sultan Sulaiman Club in Kuala Lumpur which was instrumental in creating UMNO. The Congress was organised by the Selangor Malay Society (PMS) which had as its president the scholar Zainal Abidin Ahmad (Za'ba), a critic of British colonial rule.

Election as Deputy Yang di-Pertuan Agong

On 31 August 1957, by eight votes to one, Sultan Hisamuddin Alam Shah was elected Deputy Yang di-Pertuan Agong of independent Malaya.

Election as Yang di-Pertuan Agong

Sultan Hisamuddin Alam Shah was elected second Yang di-Pertuan Agong or federal Paramount Ruler of independent Malaya (the present Malaysia before the accession of British North Borneo, Sarawak and Singapore in 1963) on the death of Tuanku Abdul Rahman. His term of office began on 14 April 1960. On 30 July 1960 he proclaimed the end of the Emergency in Malaya.

Death and funeral

Sultan Hisamuddin Alam Shah died from an unidentified illness at Istana Tetamu, in Kuala Lumpur on 1 September 1960, aged 62, the day fixed for his installation. He was interred at the Royal Mausoleum near Sultan Sulaiman Mosque in Klang, Selangor on 3 September 1960. The Malayan throne passed to the next state.

Personal life and family

Sultan Hisamuddin Alam Shah was married at least twice:
 in 1920 to Raja Jemaah binti Raja Ahmad (1900–1973), a member of a junior branch of the Selangor royal family, who served as Tengku Ampuan of Selangor and Raja Permaisuri Agong
 in 1927 to Kalsom binti Mahmud (1905–1990), who was the mother to Tengku Ampuan Besar Bariah of Terengganu.
 in after 1927 to Raja Halija binti Al-Marhum Sultan Idris Murshidul al Azzam Shah and Cik Haji Ngah Uteh Mariah binti Haji Sulaiman, daughter of DatoHaji Sulaiman and Fatimah binti To' Bandar Lambin

He was succeeded by his son by Raja Jemaah, Tengku Abdul Aziz Shah, as Sultan of Selangor, taking the title of Sultan Salahuddin Abdul Aziz Shah. Sultan Salahuddin later became the 11th Yang di-Pertuan Agong and also died while in office like his father.

Awards and recognitions

Honour of Malaya
 :
 Recipient of the Order of the Crown of the Realm (DMN) (31 August 1958)

Foreign honours
 :
 King George V Silver Jubilee Medal (1935)
 King George VI Coronation Medal (1937)
 Honorary Knight Commander of the Order of St Michael and St George (KCMG) - Sir (1938)
 Queen Elizabeth II Coronation Medal (1953)
 : 
 Member First Class of the Family Order of Laila Utama (DK) - Dato Laila Utama (24 September 1958)

Places named after him
Several places were named after him, including:
 Kolej Islam Sultan Alam Shah (previously known as Kolej Islam Kelang), was named after him.
 Sekolah Alam Shah (now Sekolah Sultan Alam Shah), first in Cheras and then in Putrajaya, was named after him.
 SMS Alam Shah, carries the name of him after Sekolah Alam Shah moved to Putrajaya
 The City of Shah Alam and Istana Alam Shah in Klang was also named in his honour.
 Jalan Sultan Hishamuddin (formerly Victory Avenue), Kuala Lumpur was named after him
 Shah Alam Cemetery
 Shah Alam Circuit
 Shah Alam Expressway
 Shah Alam Komuter station
 Shah Alam Royal Mausoleum
 Shah Alam Royale Theatre
 Shah Alam Stadium
 Shah Alam Transfer Station
 Shah Alam–Puchong Highway
 Sultan Alam Shah Museum
 SK Shah Alam, a primary school in Shah Alam, Selangor
 SK Satu Sultan Alam Shah, a primary school in Petaling Jaya, Selangor
 SK (2) Sultan Alam Shah, a primary school in Petaling Jaya, Selangor
 SK Sultan Hisamuddin Alam Shah, a primary school in Kuala Lumpur
 SMK Shah Alam, a secondary school in Shah Alam, Selangor
 SAM Sultan Hisamuddin Sungai Bertih, a secondary school in Klang, Selangor
 SAMT Sultan Hisamuddin, a secondary school in Klang, Selangor
 Kolej Komuniti Shah Alam, a community college in Shah Alam, Selangor
 Shah Alam Hospital in Shah Alam, Selangor
 Taman Tasik Shah Alam
 Shah Alam National Botanical Park
 Persiaran Hishamuddin
 Persiaran Hishamuddin LRT station

Trivia
 His reign was the shortest ever for any Yang di-Pertuan Agong, lasting only 139 days. His son's reign, from 21 September 1999 and 21 November 2001 was the second shortest at two years and sixty two days.
 He is the only Yang di-Pertuan Agong never to have been officially installed.
 He is the only Yang di-Pertuan Agong who never lived at Istana Negara, Kuala Lumpur.
 He was the last Yang di-Pertuan Agong to read the Friday sermon himself.

References

Monarchs of Malaysia
Hisamuddin
1898 births
1960 deaths
Monarchs who abdicated
Hisamuddin
Hisamuddin
Malaysian people of Malay descent
Malaysian Muslims
Malaysian people of Bugis descent
Honorary Knights Commander of the Order of St Michael and St George
20th-century Malaysian politicians
Recipients of the Order of the Crown of the Realm